The  is a short staff weapon used in Okinawa and feudal Japan.

Description
The  is a short hardwood staff that is used in the same way as the approximately 1-meter-long hanbō. Short staffs smaller than 1 meter can be called .

Usage 
The  is used in several martial arts including: jujutsu, aikido, kobudo, hapkido, yoseikan budo, Cuong Nhu.

 are swung using the elbow and shoulder, or manipulated with the wrist. Many of the motions are similar to sword strokes. The  can be deadly in skilled hands. The main use is to attack the outer edges of the human bones with speed and accuracy. Applying this concept, virtually every part of the target can be hit with this weapon.

To use this weapon effectively, the opponent may be imagined as a 2-dimensional object standing in front of the attacker, and the objective is to strike various targets (i.e. the top and back of the head, collarbone, hands, elbows, ribs, hip, kneecaps, and calves).  Soft tissues can be targeted, and the attacker can then aim at the abdomen, throat, eyes, thighs and groin.

The  can also be used for thrusting, checks or deflections, pummeling the enemy (with the ends), blocking strikes (while holding both ends), joint locks, chokes and parrying various sorts of attacks. Speed, distance, accuracy, timing and control are the key components in the successful use of this weapon.

See also 
 Okinawan kobudō
 Bō
 Budō
 Bujutsu
 Hanbō
 Jō
 Quarterstaff
 Yawara
 Kubotan
 Baston (weapon)

References

Bibliography 
 

Samurai staff weapons
Staff weapons of Japan
Weapons of Okinawa